British Library, Add MS 14479, is a Syriac manuscript of the New Testament, on parchment. It is dated by a colophon to the year 534. It is one of the oldest manuscript of Peshitta and the earliest dated Peshitta Apostolos.

Description 
It contains the text of the fourteen Pauline epistles, on 101 leaves (8 ⅞ by 5 ½ inches), with only three lacunae (folio 1, 29, and 38). Written in one column per page, in 25-33 lines per page. The Epistle to the Hebrews is placed after Philemon.
Numerous Syriac vowels and signs of punctuations have been added by a Nestorian hand, as well as a few Greek vowels by another reader.

It was written for the monastery in Edessa, in a small, elegant Estrangela hand in the year 533-534. The first folio was supplemented by a later hand in the twelfth century, folio 28 and 39 were supplemented in the thirteenth century.

The manuscript is housed at the British Library (Additional Manuscripts 14479) in London.

See also 

 List of the Syriac New Testament manuscripts
 Other manuscripts
 Codex Phillipps 1388
 British Library, Add MS 14455
 British Library, Add MS 14459
 British Library, Add MS 14669
 Sortable articles
 Syriac versions of the Bible
 Biblical manuscript

References

Further reading 

 William Wright, Catalogue of the Syriac manuscripts in the British Museum (1870; reprint: Gorgias Press 2002).

External links 

 William Wright, Catalogue of the Syriac manuscripts in the British Museum

Peshitta manuscripts
6th-century biblical manuscripts
Add. 14479
British Library additional manuscripts